Necip Fazıl is an underground station on the M5 line of the Istanbul Metro in Ümraniye. The station is located on Alemdağ Street in the Necip Fazıl neighborhood of Ümraniye. Connection to IETT city buses is available from at street level.

The M5 line operates as fully automatic unattended train operation (UTO). The station consists of an island platform with two tracks. Since the M5 is an ATO line, protective gates on each side of the platform open only when a train is in the station.

Necip Fazıl station was opened on 21 October 2018.

The station has 3 exits. There are 4 elevators and 12 escalators. Connection to Metrogarden Shopping Center can be provided from the station.

Station layout

Connections 
Connection to IETT city buses is available from at street level.

City buses; 9ÜD, 11R, 11SA, 11V, 14, 14A, 14AK, 14CE, 14T, 19S, 19SB, 131, 131A, 131B, 131C, 131H, 131T, 131TD, 131Ü, 522, 522B, ÇM41, UM40, UM60, UM61, UM73

References

External links 

 Official Website of Istanbul Metro (in English)

Railway stations opened in 2018
Istanbul metro stations
Ümraniye
2018 establishments in Turkey